John Crawford (dates unknown) was an American silversmith, active in New York City from 1815 to 1836, and in Philadelphia from 1837 to 1843.

References 
 Classical Savannah: Fine & Decorative Arts, 1800-1840, Page Talbott, University of Georgia Press, 1995, page 94. .
 American Silversmiths and Their Marks: The Definitive (1948) Edition, Stephen G. C. Ensko, Courier Corporation, 2012, page 203.

American silversmiths
19th-century American artists